Raúl Foullon (born 25 February 1955) is a Mexican judoka. He competed in the men's half-middleweight event at the 1972 Summer Olympics.

References

1955 births
Living people
Mexican male judoka
Olympic judoka of Mexico
Judoka at the 1972 Summer Olympics
Place of birth missing (living people)
20th-century Mexican people